Maurice Anthony "Tony" Reeson (24 September 1933 – 1990) was an English professional footballer who played as an inside forward.

References

1933 births
1990 deaths
People from Rotherham
English footballers
Association football inside forwards
Rotherham United F.C. players
Grimsby Town F.C. players
Doncaster Rovers F.C. players
Southport F.C. players
Gainsborough Trinity F.C. players
Alfreton Town F.C. players
English Football League players